Vaa may refer to:

 Loch Vaa, a body of water in Highland, Scotland

People with the surname
 Aslaug Vaa (1889–1965), Norwegian poet and playwright
 Dyre Vaa (1903–1980), Norwegian sculptor and painter

See also
 VAA (disambiguation)
 Va'a